A by-election for the constituency of Glasgow Hillhead in the House of Commons was held on 25 November 1948, caused by the appointment as a Lord of Appeal in Ordinary of the incumbent Unionist MP James Reid. The result was a hold for the Unionist Party, with their candidate Tam Galbraith.

Result

Despite a clear victory for their party some Scottish Unionist MPs were reportedly disappointed by the result given  that the recent Edmonton by-election had seen the Conservative Party's vote substantially increased while Labour's vote fell greatly. Commenting on the by-election, an editorial in The Glasgow Herald rejected and criticised this assessment, noting that there was a lower turnout and opining that it was a "a notable achievement" that Galbraith had increased the Unionist Party's majority by a third, given that, in the newspaper's view, he was "a young candidate succeeding one of the outstanding Unionist members of recent years."

Previous election

References

 Craig, F. W. S. (1983) [1969]. British parliamentary election results 1918-1949 (3rd edition ed.). Chichester: Parliamentary Research Services. . 
 

Glasgow Hillhead by-election
Glasgow Hillhead by-election
Glasgow Hillhead by-election, 1948
Hillhead by-election, 1948
Glasgow Hillhead by-election
Hillhead, 1948